Leo M. Reinbold (March 24, 1933 – February 11, 2010) was a North Dakota Republican Party politician who served as North Dakota Public Service Commissioner from 1981 to 2003.

Biography
Leo Reinbold was born in Glen Ullin, North Dakota in 1933. He was educated in public schools in Hebron, North Dakota, and he graduated from Dickinson State University. He taught school for 25 years in the states of North Dakota and Montana, including 19 years at Valley City State University where he was chairman of the Department of Geography. He was named an Outstanding Educator in America in 1971, and was awarded a Distinguished Alumnus Award from Dickinson State in 1985. He was elected to the North Dakota Public Service Commission in 1980, and he served until his resignation on July 31, 2003 when Parkinson's disease began to have a greater effect on his abilities.

Notes

People from Morton County, North Dakota
Dickinson State University alumni
North Dakota Public Service Commissioners
North Dakota Republicans
1933 births
2010 deaths
People with Parkinson's disease